Gerson Romario Vázquez Ogara (born 12 November 2001) is a Mexican professional footballer who plays as a winger.

Career statistics

Club

References

External links
Gerson Vázquez at Official Liga MX Profile
Gerson Vázquez at Soccerway US
Gerson Vázquez at WhoScored

Living people
Querétaro F.C. footballers
Mexican footballers
2001 births
Liga MX players
Association football forwards
Footballers from Baja California
Sportspeople from Tijuana